Hainault may refer to:

 An older spelling for the County of Hainaut (across the border of modern-day Belgium and France)
 Hainault, London, a suburban area of London, UK
 Hainault Bulldogs, a rugby league team, Dagenham, Essex
 Hainault Depot, on the London Underground Central line
 Hainault Forest, a country park in London
 Hainault Forest High School, former name of The Forest Academy, London
 Hainault Lodge, a nature reserve in London
 Fairlop Loop, a branch line of the former Great Eastern Railway, London, now a portion of the Hainault Loop on the London Underground Central line
 Hainault tube station, station on the London Underground Central line

See also
 Hainau (disambiguation)
 Hainaut (disambiguation)
 Henao